to.get.her is a 2011 American mystery thriller film directed by Erica Dunton, starring Jazzy De Lisser, Chelsea Logan, Adwoa Aboah, Audrey Speicher, Jami Eaton, Jill Jackson and Ed Wagenseller. It had its premier at the Sundance Film Festival in 2011, where it won the Best of NEXT Audience Award, and was released digitally on 15 January 2013.

Cast
 Jazzy De Lisser as Ana Frost
 Chelsea Logan as China Rees
 Adwoa Aboah as Emily Mateo
 Audrey Speicher as Abigail Pearce
 Jami Eaton as Zoe Lindermann
 Jill Jackson as Margaret Frost
 Ed Wagenseller as Robert Engledew
 Jon Stafford as Peter
 Jason Davis as Bryan
 Cullen Moss as Paul
 Taylor Kowalski as Gus
 James Forgey as Daniel
 Traci Dinwiddie as Ruth
 Tammy Arnold as Therapist
 Trisha Paytas as Fantasy Girl

Production
to.get.her was filmed over 12 days entirely in Wilmington, North Carolina with a Canon EOS 7D, which is primarily a still camera. Approximately 85% of the film was shot with a 600mm anamorphic lens, which caused the camera to be positioned up to two blocks away from the actors.

Release
The film premiered at the Sundance Film Festival on 21 January 2011, where it won the Best of NEXT Audience Award.

It was released digitally for purchase on 15 January, 2013, along with 12 other recent Sundance movies to help promote the 2013 festival, and then streaming on Netflix and Hulu on February 15.

Reception
Michael Dunaway of Paste gave the film a rating of 8.1/10, calling it "visually interesting and innovative", and praised the performances of De Lisser and Aboah.

Rob Nelson of Variety wrote that while Dunton "strains for high-school gravitas and achieves a smidgen of it in her twisty final reel", the "absurdity" of the film and the "horrid" dialogue "ought to prevent its graduation from an award-winning Sundance bow to release."

The Hollywood Reporter wrote that the action is "competently framed but plagued by filter effects that do nothing to make the tedious drama less annoying to sit through."

References

External links
 
 

American mystery thriller films
2010s mystery thriller films
Sundance Film Festival award winners